This is a list of Brazilian television related events from 2009.

Events
7 April - Max Porto wins the ninth season of Big Brother Brasil.
28 June - Actress Paolla Oliveira and her partner Atila Amaral win the sixth season of Dança dos Famosos.
16 December - Saulo Roston wins the fourth season of Ídolos Brazil. He had eliminated from the third season's top 30.

Debuts
20 April - Peixonauta (2009–2015)

Television shows

1970s
Vila Sésamo (1972-1977, 2007–present)
Turma da Mônica (1976–present)

1990s
Malhação (1995–2020)
Cocoricó (1996–2013)

2000s
Big Brother Brasil (2002–2012)
Dança do s Famosos (2005–present)
Ídolos (2006-2012)

Ending this year

Births

Deaths

See also
2009 in Brazil
List of Brazilian films of 2009